"100 Black Coffins" is a song by American rapper Rick Ross, taken from the soundtrack to Quentin Tarantino's film Django Unchained. It was produced during filming by actor and R&B singer Jamie Foxx, who also plays the lead role of Django in the film.

It peaked at #100 in Germany and #69 in France, becoming one of Ross' most successful singles in Germany and his most successful single in France.

Charts

References

External links
Rick Ross At The Oscars? Jamie Foxx Gives 'Django' Track His Bid (MTV)
'100 Black Coffins': Rick Ross' Jamie Foxx-Produced 'Django Unchained' Track Drops (Huffington Post)
Jamie Foxx Talks Pitching "100 Black Coffins" To Ross and Tarantino on The Jonathan Ross Show (Vibe)
Rick Ross – “100 Black Coffins” (Stereogum)

Rick Ross songs
2012 songs
2013 singles
Songs written by Jamie Foxx
Def Jam Recordings singles
Warner Records singles
Maybach Music Group singles